Beyblade, known in Japan as , is a Japanese manga series written and illustrated by  to promote sales of spinning tops called "Beyblades" developed by Takara Tomy. The series focuses on a group of kids who form teams, which battle one another using Beyblades. Originally serialized in Shogakukan's CoroCoro Comic from September 1999 to July 2004, the individual chapters were collected and published in 14 tankōbon volumes and was licensed for English-language release in North America by Viz Media. 

An anime adaptation aired in Japan on TV Tokyo from January to December 2001 and was followed by two sequel series, Beyblade V-Force and Beyblade G-Revolution, and the 2002 film Beyblade: Fierce Battle. Nelvana licensed and produced English-language adaptations of the anime series and the film.

Plot and characters

Beyblade 
Tyson Granger is an enthusiastic young man who loves Beyblade. He begins his journey after befriending fellow Beyblade enthusiast, Kenny, and drawing the attention of Kai Hiwatari, a formidable Blader, after defeating Carlos, the leader of his neighborhood's Beyblade gang, the Blade Sharks. Tyson and Kai develop a rivalry that leads to him discovering that his Beyblade contains a Bit-Beast named Dragoon. Seeking to challenge Kai again, Tyson competes in the Japanese Regional Beyblade Qualifying Tournament and befriends fellow competitors, Ray Kon and Max Tate, both of whom possess their own Bit-Beast.

After winning the tournament, Tyson goes on to form a team with Kai, Ray and Max named the Bladebreakers. Kenny tags along as their manager. The Bladebreakers tour China to register for the championships and confront the White Tigers, Ray's former team, who hold a grudge against Ray for leaving them. Toward the end of the Chinese tournament, Ray and his ex-teammates make amends, and the Bladebreakers win the tournament.

After this, Tyson and his friends arrive in the United States to fight the All Starz, who are coached by Max's mother. After winning the American League, the team finds itself stranded in Europe. They tour Europe and meet Oliver, Enrique, Johnny and Robert, who go by the name Majestics.

The Bladebreakers battle the Majestics and the Bladebreakers win the battle. They then go to Russia for the final tournament. In Russia, they meet Boris's team, the Demolition Boys, of which Kai was also a member of in the past. Kai had forgotten about Boris and the training grounds where he had learned almost everything he knew about Beyblading. However, he soon regains his memory. He finds Black Dranzer, his dream Beyblade, and decides to join the Demolition Boys team, aiming to be the best Beyblader. Tyson finds out and tries to convince Kai to return to the Bladebreakers, but Kai rejects him, throwing his old Beyblade, Dranzer, at Tyson's feet. Tyson keeps Dranzer with him and vows to bring Kai back. Soon, before the finals, Kai challenges the Bladebreakers to steal their Bit-Beasts and become most powerful Blader. However, only Tyson and Ray show up. Max is still at the airport, returning from where he was training with Tyson and Ray with his new Beyblade, Draciel. Just at the moment when Kai seems to be close to taking the Bit-Beasts of Tyson and Ray, Max comes and challenges Kai. Kai thinks that he can easily beat Draciel but he can not, and soon Tyson uses Kai's own old Blade, Dranzer, to beat the Black Dranzer and defeat Kai. Kai, shocked by the power of Dranzer, does not notice the ice beneath him cracking and falls into the frozen water below. Tyson, Ray, Max and Kenny rescue Kai. Realizing the power of friendship as well as the power of Dranzer, Kai returns to the Bladebreakers.

In the final match, Tyson battles Tala, winning the match and becoming a Beyblade World Champion for the first time.

Beyblade V-Force
The Bladebreakers have gone their separate ways. But when Team Psykick and the Saint Shields attack the Bladebreakers and try to steal their Bit-Beasts, the Bladebreakers reassemble to defeat the new enemies. Tyson and Kenny's classmate Hilary Tachibana (Hiromi Tachibana) joins the Bladebreakers but takes time to learn that Beyblade is not just the stupid game she thinks it is.

In an attempt to steal the four Bit-Beasts from the Bladebreakers, Team Psykick creates four cyber Bit-Beast copies of the Bladebreakers' Bit-Beasts and recruit four skilled bladers named Kane, Salima, Goki, and Jim. These teenagers were pure-hearted and innocent bladers with high ambitions, but the dark power of the cyber Bit-Beasts gradually take over their minds and turn them evil. The first half of the second season ends with the Bladebreakers defeating Team Psykick. Tyson, Ray, Kai and Max battle Kane, Salima, Goki and Jim respectively and defeat them. After the cyber beasts are destroyed Team Psykick come back to their normal selves and regain consciousness. The second half of Season 2 deals with the truth of why the Saint Shields and Team Psykick are after Bladebreakers' Bit-Beasts and about a rock that Max's mother found that contains Bit-Beasts, which is stolen by Team Psykick.

The Saint Shields' reason behind attempting to steal the Bit-Beasts is because they wish to seal them in a rock because they fear that the Bit-Beasts could get out of control like they did in the past. The Saint Shields battle the Bladebreakers and manage to seal Ray's Bit-Beast Driger into a sealing stone. Later Ray reclaims Driger and defeats all the Saint Shields in a team face-off. The Psykick's leader, Dr. Zagart, wants the Bit-Beasts to turn his android son Zeo (an exact replica of his son who died in an accident) into a real human.

After defeating the Saint Shields, Tyson meets Zeo and befriends him without knowing that he is the son of Team Psykick's leader. Zeo is unaware that he is an android and that his father is behind all of Team Psykick's plans. Later Zeo finds out about his past and decides to help his father in his plans. Dr. Zagart gives Zeo a bit beast named Cerberus, the strongest Bit-Beast sealed in the rock. Zeo enters the world Beyblade tournament with the motive of defeating all the Bladebreakers members and stealing their Bit-Beasts. In the tournament, Zeo defeats Kai and Max and steals their Bit-Beasts Dranzer and Draciel. But in the final battle Tyson and Dragoon (Tyson's Bit-Beast) defeat Zeo and Cerberus. In the process, Tyson and Max's team win the world tournament. Dranzer and Draciel come back to their original bladers, Kai and Max.

Beyblade G-Revolution
Kai, Ray, and Max left Tyson and went their separate ways to rejoin their old teams so that they have a chance to beat each other at the World Championship which has been re-designed with tag-teams of two. Max joins the PPB All Starz, Ray joins White Tiger X, and Kai joins the Blitzkrieg Boys. This leaves only Tyson, Hilary, and Kenny on the team. A new character, Daichi Sumeragi, and Tyson's older brother, Hiro Granger, join them. The two other teams involved are the Barthez Battalion and F-Dynasty.

One week after the results of the World Championships, Boris, the secondary villain from the first season, returns and creates the new Beyblade Entertainment Global Association, (BEGA) replacing the BBA. Boris tries to fool Tyson and co. into believing he has made up for his past, while he is actually trying to gain control over all Bladers and Beyblading activity. After a while however, they see what Boris is trying to pull. Tyson challenges BEGA's best to a battle, and Boris decides to hold a 5-on-5 tournament in one month's time. But he declares that all the Beyblade shops must sell Beyblades and their parts to BEGA associated Beybladers only, otherwise they will not be allowed to run the shops.

Tyson and the team find some parts at Max's father's store, which are insufficient. Then after sometime Kenny comes with the solution, he makes a new type of Beyblades known as hard metal Beyblades, using a different type of parts. But they still needed one more blader, and that is when Kai, who tried to join BEGA but lost severely to Brooklyn, disbanded the Blitzkrieg Boys and rejoined the team now known as the G Revolutions. Additionally during the BEGA qualifying matches Kai's former teammates, Spencer and Bryan of the Blitzkrieg Boys defeat a BEGA Training squad but lose easily to a mysterious blader known as Garland Siebald. Tala, the leader of the Blitzkrieg Boys who was previously the final boss in season 1, takes on Garland but lost the match and was seriously injured after Garland activated his attack, Radiant Thunder and ended the match. Daichi and Ray lose the first two matches to Ming-Ming and Crusher only proving that their hard metal blades were also no match for their powerful blades. Max ends the third match with Mystel in a draw. Then it is Kai's turn. He chooses unbeaten Brooklyn as his Opponent. Kai defeats Brooklyn in that match. Then Tyson beats Garland. Brooklyn becomes insane due to his loss to Kai and start having nightmares about Kai. After that, he confronts Tyson. In the ensuing match, Tyson and Brooklyn battle it out in the tie-breaker match. As the final fight rages on, Brooklyn goes berserk and merges with his bit-beast Zeus which threatens to destroy the entire universe. in the end Tyson is able to absorb the powers of every single Bit-Beast and after a final attack, Brooklyn became normal while both blades were still spinning (but the match after that was not shown assumed as a draw). And the BEGA corporation had fallen thanks to the efforts of the Bladebreakers (G-Revolutions). The episode ends with Tyson and Kai to have one final match.

In the Japanese version, the episode ends with a special ending showing every major character from the series.

Beyblade Rising

Kai returns to Japan after completing his studies. Tyson learns of this and tries to meet Kai, but when he reaches there he finds that Kai has left beyblading and is now controlling his grandfather's company. Tyson is shocked to hear this. He understands that Kai is abandoning his passion just to keep his grandpa, Voltaire's will. Tyson makes Kai understand and listen to his inner voice. Voltaire at last understands his mistake and allows Kai to carry on his journey. Tyson challenges Kai for a beybattle. Kai is about to be defeated when he uses his beyblading skills and defeats Tyson. Tyson and others are shocked but he is glad to find his friend back to action.

Media

Manga
The chapters of the Beyblade manga were written and illustrated by Takao Aoki. It was serialized in CoroCoro Comic from 1999 to 2004. The manga was licensed for an English-language release by Viz Media.

In 2016, Takao Aoki released a sequel manga called  featuring the original characters, which is currently ongoing. The series is serialized in CoroCoro Aniki.

Anime

The series was adapted in a television anime series produced by Madhouse, making it the studio's first use of digital ink and paint. Spanning 51 episodes, the series aired in Japan on TV Tokyo from January 8, 2001, to December 24, 2001. A sequel series produced by Nihon Animedia titled Beyblade V-Force ran for another 51 episodes from January 7, 2002, until December 30, 2002. The third series, Beyblade G-Revolution, ran for 52 episodes from January 6, 2003, until its conclusion on December 29, 2003.

All three seasons were licensed for English adaptation, broadcast, and release by Nelvana. The series was broadcast on the sibling cable channel YTV in Canada and ABC Family in the United States in 2002. Reruns were also seen on Toon Disney, as part of Jetix from 2004–2005, and again in 2006, as part of Jetix's "Anime Invasion Sundays" block. The series was distributed by Geneon Entertainment for its first two seasons and FUNimation Entertainment for the third season. The license for all three seasons were acquired by Discotek Media on November 30, 2018. They released all three on English dub-only standard definition Blu-ray; the first season on January 29, V-Force on February 26, and G-Revolution on March 26, 2019.

Several spin-off series have since been produced, including Beyblade: Metal Saga, the BeyWheelz series, and Beyblade Burst.

Live-action film
A Deadline Hollywood piece in May 2015 reported that Paramount Pictures had acquired the rights to make a live action film based on Beyblade after the box office success of Hasbro's Transformers and G.I. Joe film series. The film will be produced by Mary Parent through her Disruption Entertainment banner. 
In February 2022, it was reported that Jerry Bruckheimer will be producing the film.

Merchandise
Beyblade developed a cult following when the series' popular spinning top toy was launched worldwide. Now with the released fourth season of the Metal Fight Beyblade series, Metal Fight Beyblade Zero-G, aka Beyblade Shogun Steel, a toy line which consists of Beyblades from the anime including Samurai Ifraid W145CF, MSF Shinobi Saramanda SW145SD, MSF Pirates Orojya 145D, Thief Phoenix E230GCF, Guardian Reviser 160SB, MSF Archer Gryph C145S, Pirates Killerken A230JSB, and many more are being released in Asia.

Beyblade, Let It Rip! The Official Album was released in the UK to coincide with the show's popularity. It featured the anime's opening theme, as well as songs by artists including Nickelback and Busted. In Germany the Album Beyblade V-Force was released. Like the UK Album it featured the Opening song and other songs by artists like Noel Pix or Petra Scheeser (Wind). It was produced by Arts of Toyco.

Toys

Originally developed and manufactured by Takara Tomy, first released in 2000. The toys include a 'launcher' – a device for bringing the spinning top up to speed in a plastic arena known as a Beystadium, with a slightly dished base, where they subsequently strike each other. The last top still spinning wins. Beyblade is largely a game of power and angle, although many players believe a particular launch style can influence the outcome of a game. Later on, Hasbro started to make beyblade spinning tops too.

Reception

Common Sense Media described the series as a "formulaic toy-inspired series [that] has some good messages." Don Houston of DVD Talk wrote, "The show is just one long repetitive commercial, and not a well made commercial at that."

References

External links
Official Website
Beyblade at Internet Movie Database
Beyblade blog
Author of the BeyBlade logo – George Peter Gatsis

Beyblade
2001 anime television series debuts
2002 anime television series debuts
2003 anime television series debuts
Animated television series about children
Japanese children's animated action television series
Japanese children's animated science fantasy television series
Japanese children's animated sports television series
Children's manga
Comics based on toys
Discotek Media
Funimation
Geneon USA
Madhouse (company)
Mass media franchises
Nippon Animation
Shogakukan manga
Television series by Nelvana
TV Tokyo original programming
Viz Media manga